Estadio Heliodoro Rodriguez Lopez also Estadio de Tenerife is a football stadium in Santa Cruz de Tenerife, Tenerife, Canary Islands, Spain. It is the home ground of CD Tenerife. With a capacity of 22,824 seats, it is the 27th-largest stadium in Spain and the second-largest in the Canary Islands. It has dimensions of 107 x 70 metres, making it the stadium with the largest area of field of the Canary Islands.

History 
The stadium was inaugurated on July 25, 1925 with the game between Tenerife and Marino from Las Palmas.

The plant was designed by the architects José Enrique Marrero Regalado and Carlos Schwartz. The dimensions of the soccer field are 107x70m and it has a capacity of 22,948 spectators, which makes it the stadium with the largest playing surface in the archipelago. The original name of the field was "Stadium" and it was changed to the current one in 1950.

The stadium was renovated in 1949 and 2000 following as models the Mini Estadi and the Alberto Jacinto Armando Stadium. In the first half of the 90s it was also used for matches of the Spanish team.

International matches

Spain national team matches

See also
Club Deportivo Tenerife

References

CD Tenerife
Multi-purpose stadiums in Spain
Football venues in the Canary Islands
Buildings and structures in Santa Cruz de Tenerife
Sports venues completed in 1925
Sport in Santa Cruz de Tenerife